Beznabad may refer to:
 Beznabad-e Olya
 Beznabad-e Sofla